Dr. Ziauddin Hospitals is a Pakistani health care company operating primarily in Karachi, Sindh, Pakistan. It is functioning under Dr. Faisal Ziauddin. The hospitals provide medical treatment and care. It is named after noted academic Ziauddin Ahmad. The group also owns Ziauddin University and Health TV.

The group operate five hospitals across Karachi, totaling over 600 beds provide medical care. According to the Ranking Web of Hospitals for Pakistan, Dr. Ziauddin Hospitals rank at position 19 on the list of Top 20 Hospitals of Pakistan.

The services provided at hospitals are X-Ray and Ultrasound, MRI, CT scan, Digital Subtraction Angiography, Colour Doppler Mammography and Interventional Radiology. A COVID-19 ward was set up at the hospital in 2020.

Dr. Ziauddin Hospitals Campuses 
 Cancer Hospital, Block-B, North Nazimabad.
 Dr. Ziauddin Hospital, Shahrah-e-Ghalib, Clifton.
 Dr. Ziauddin Hospital, Behind KPT Hospital, Keamari.
 Dr. Ziauddin Hospital, Block III, Gole Market, Nazimabad.
 Dr. Ziauddin Hospital, Block-B, North Nazimabad.

Controversy
The group is owned by Dr. Asim Hussain and is under-investigation for using public money to expand the group. Pakistan Rangers and Sindh Police raided the Ziauddin Hospitals. Dr. Asim Hussain was remanded into Rangers custody for 90-days for investigating his role in Money laundering, Land grabbing, extending financial support to terrorists and illegally issuing licenses for unlawful CNG stations across Sindh.

See also 
 Ziauddin Ahmed
 Ziauddin University
 Dr. Asim Hussain

References

External links 
 Official website

Health care companies of Pakistan
Hospital networks in Pakistan
Hospitals in Karachi
Companies based in Karachi
Corruption in Pakistan